The trial and conviction of Alfred Dreyfus was the event that instigated the Dreyfus Affair, a political scandal which divided France during the 1890s and early 1900s. It involved the wrongful conviction for treason of Alfred Dreyfus, a French artillery officer of Alsatian Jewish background. Dreyfus was sentenced to life in prison on Devil's Island.

The report of Major , handed in on December 3, was prejudiced and illogical. He had vainly tried to deduce a proof of some sort out of a heap of "possibilities" and numerous insinuations. Edgar Demange, whom the Dreyfus family had chosen as their lawyer, accepted this task only on the condition that the perusal of the papers should convince him of the emptiness of the accusation. He was convinced.

Demange concentrated on obtaining a public hearing, promising on his honour not to raise any delicate questions that might lead to a diplomatic incident. The brothers of Dreyfus and certain statesmen made urgent application in the same direction. However, the minister decided that a private hearing was required by "state policy," he announced this conviction to the president of the court martial; such an announcement was equivalent to an order.

The trial

The case began on December 19, 1894 at the Cherche-Midi prison, and lasted four days. The court was composed of seven judges, none of them an artilleryman. The president was Colonel Maurel. From the start, the commissary of the government, Major Brisset, demanded a public trial. The protests of Demange, who tried to make it known that the accusation was based on a single document, were overruled by the president, and a secret trial was unanimously agreed upon. In the courtroom there remained, besides the judges, only the accused and his attorney, the prefect of police Louis Lépine and Major Georges Picquart, who was entrusted with the duty of giving an account of the proceedings to the head of the staff and to the minister. The case dragged along with hardly any incident worthy of remark. The "colourless" voice of Dreyfus, his unsympathetic appearance and military correctness weakened the effect of his persistent denials. On the other hand, the "moral proofs" would not bear discussion. Du Paty de Clam got entangled in his description of the scene of the dictation. Bertillon brought forward a revised and much enlarged edition of his report. The only testimony that produced any impression was that of Major Henry. After his first statement, he asked to be recalled. Then, in a loud voice, he declared that, long before the arrival of the bordereau, an honourable person (meaning Valcarlos) had warned the Intelligence Department that an officer of the ministry, an officer of the second bureau, was betraying his country. "And that traitor, there he is!" With his finger he pointed out Dreyfus. And when the president asked him if the "honourable person" had named Dreyfus, Henry stretched out his hand toward the crucifix and declared, "I swear it!"

The last hearing on December 22 was devoted to the public prosecutor's address and to the pleading of Demange, who spent three hours arguing that the very contents of the bordereau showed that it could not be the work of Dreyfus. In his reply, Brisset asked the judges to take their "magnifying-glasses". A calm listener, Major Picquart, thought the result was very doubtful unless help came from the secret dossier. This dossier was given up, still sealed, by Major Du Paty (who was ignorant of the contents) to Colonel Maurel, and the latter immediately entered the room where the judges were deliberating on the case, and communicated it to his colleagues. The recollections of the military judges being rather vague on the subject, it has not been possible to reconstitute with certainty the substance of the portfolio. However, it is known that it included at least the document "canaille de D ..." (a commonplace initial which it was absurd, after Panizzardi's telegram, to attribute to Dreyfus), and a sort of military biography of Dreyfus, based on, but not identical with, a memorandum from Du Paty, who had been told to make the various documents of the secret dossier coincide with one another. This biography presented Dreyfus as a traitor by birth, having begun spying as soon as he entered the service.

The secret dossier
Among the other papers of the secret dossier were the fragments of Schwartzkoppen's note alluding to an informant who pretended to take his knowledge from the ministry, and, according to Commander Freystaetter, the first and false interpretation of Panizzardi's despatch. After judgement had been pronounced, the dossier was given back to Mercier, who had it pulled to pieces, and later on destroyed the biographical notice. But, contrary to instructions, Major Henry reconstituted the secret dossier, added to it Du Paty's explanatory note (which last was destroyed by Mercier in 1897), and locked it in the iron chest where Picquart afterwards found it. Allusion has been made several times (since 1894) to a second "ultra-secret” dossier that was composed of photographs of papers stolen from, and then given up to, the German embassy; namely, seven letters from Dreyfus, and one said to be from the Emperor of Germany to Count Münster, naming Dreyfus. No reputable historian believes there is any evidence for this dossier.

Sentence
Dreyfus was unanimously pronounced guilty. He was sentenced to life imprisonment, to be preceded by military degradation. Upon hearing this decision, communicated to him by the clerk of the court, Dreyfus, who firmly believed he would be acquitted, was stunned. Taken back to prison, he was seized with despair, and begged for a revolver. Ferdinand Forzinetti, who had not lost faith in his innocence, had great difficulty in calming him. However, the touching letters from his wife made him accept life, if only as a duty he owed to his own family.

The appeal of Dreyfus to the military court of revision––little more than a formality––was rejected on December 31, 1894. The same day, the condemned man received a visit from Du Paty de Clam, who had been sent by the minister of war with the mission to declare to Dreyfus that if he would make a confession and reveal the nature of his indiscretions, he might obtain a mitigation of his sentence. Dreyfus answered that he had nothing to confess. He asked only that the investigations might be continued so as to discover the real criminal. Du Paty, somewhat moved, said to him on going out: "If you are innocent, you are the greatest martyr of all time." Dreyfus wrote an account of this interview to the minister. He finished with these words: "Once I am gone, let them go on searching; it is the only favor I ask".

Military degradation

The military degradation took place on the Champ de Mars on January 5, 1895. During the parade of "execution”, Dreyfus preserved a military attitude which shocked some onlookers. When General Darras had pronounced the accustomed words, he cried out in a loud voice, "You are degrading an innocent man! Long live France! Long live the army!" He repeated this cry while the adjutant on duty was tearing off his stripes and breaking his sword, and again while passing before the crowd, which was calling for his death, and the journalists, who called him Judas.

If the unanimous verdict of seven judges dissipated any public doubts, the reiterated protestations of the condemned man brought them to life again. The report was spread that he had made a confession. While waiting for the parade, locked up with Lebrun-Renault, the captain of gendarmerie on duty, he was supposed to have said: "The minister knows that I am innocent; and that, if I have given up any documents to Germany, it was only to get more important ones in return; before three years are over the truth will be known." This tale had its origin in the obscure account that Lebrun Renault had rendered of his conversation with Dreyfus. In reality, the latter had merely related his interview with Du Paty and protested his innocence. Renault himself, in an interview, related, in the words of Dreyfus, the origin of the bordereau, but not a word of confession. However that may be, this idle talk made the staff uneasy, because it brought into the case the German embassy, which was showing signs of indignation. In short, General Gonse called on Lebrun Renault and took him successively to General Mercier and to the president of the republic, Casimir-Perier, who imposed absolute silence for the future upon him.

Germany
Meanwhile, serious complications with Germany were expected. Once assured by Schwartzkoppen, as well as the War Office at Berlin, that Dreyfus was utterly unknown to them, the German government protested publicly against the statements in the newspapers that persisted in bringing Germany into the case. Several times after the arrest of Dreyfus, semi-official notes of protest had been inserted in the different organs of the press; Georg Herbert zu Münster, the German ambassador, denied to Hanotaux that Germany had taken any part in the affair. These declarations, although politely received, left the French government absolutely skeptical, for it knew from a positive source the origin of the bordereau.

On November 30, a note from the Havas Agency put the foreign embassies out of the case but the press continued to incriminate Germany. At the beginning of December, Münster, by the express order of the German Emperor, invited Hanotaux to call at the embassy and repeated his protestations. The report was spread abroad that Germany had demanded and obtained the restoration of the documents that established the traitor's guilt.

Provoked by the persistence of these attacks, the German embassy inserted in the "Figaro" of 26 December a fresh notice denying formally that it had "the least intercourse, either direct or indirect" with Dreyfus. As this notice also seemed to have little or no effect, the Emperor telegraphed to Münster on 5 January to go personally to Casimir-Perier and say, "If it be proved that the German embassy has never been implicated in the Dreyfus case, I hope the government will not hesitate to declare the fact." Otherwise, it was understood that the ambassador would leave Paris. This dispatch, communicated by Münster to Charles Dupuy, who was then temporarily engaged at the Foreign Office, had the appearance of an ultimatum.

Up to this point, the president of the republic had known very little of the details of the case, and having been kept by Hanotaux in complete ignorance of Münster's previous communications. But now he had the contents of the legal documents shown to him, and after reading them, he granted Münster the audience that he had requested. Considering honesty to be the best policy, he asserted very frankly that the criminal letter had been taken from the German embassy, but that it was not an important document and that nothing proved that it had been "solicited."

After having referred the matter to Berlin, Münster consented to the drawing up of a note by the Havas Agency, which once more put all the embassies out of the case, and terminated the incident, on 9 January 1895. General Auguste Mercier did not long enjoy his triumph. On January 15, under pretext of a ministerial crisis, in which his friends abandoned him, Casimir-Perier handed in his resignation as president of the republic, the mysteries and intrigue of the Dreyfus affair apparently hastening this decision.

As the congress called together to elect a new president, printed ballots were passed about putting forth General Mercier as a candidate. One handbill even set him down as the savior of the republic, for having had the traitor Dreyfus condemned in spite of all difficulties. However, he obtained only three votes. Ribot, entrusted by the new president, Félix Faure, with forming a cabinet, did not appeal to an assistant so compromised as Mercier, and the office of the minister of war was given to General Zurlinden.

Île de Ré
Two days later, in bitterly cold weather on the night of January 17, Dreyfus was taken from the prison of La Santé and transferred by rail to La Rochelle. From there, he was moved into a military reformatory on the Île de Ré, off France's western coast. The populace, recognizing him, followed him thirsting for his blood. An officer struck him but Dreyfus was stoical, even empathizing with his tormentors, whose indignation against such a traitor as he was supposed to be he understood and shared. On the Île de Ré, as at La Santé, he was authorized to receive a few visits from his wife, but the authorities managed to make them as short and uncomfortable as possible.

A law passed ad hoc had just instituted the Iles du Salut off French Guiana as the place of transportation for political crimes. This replaced the peninsula of Ducos (New Caledonia) where, it was said, supervision was difficult. It has been suggested that vengeance was being taken on Dreyfus for his obstinate refusal to confess. The notice drawn up by the War Office for the use of his guardians denounced him as "a hardened malefactor, quite unworthy of pity." On the evening of February 21, he was taken hurriedly from his cell and embarked on the Ville de St. Nazaire, which carried him across the Atlantic to his place of exile.

Devil's Island

Notwithstanding its name ("Salut," health), it was a most unhealthy region, with incessant heat, continuous rain for five months of the year, and effluvia arising from the marshy land. The smallest island of the group, Devil's Island, which had been occupied by a leper colony until Dreyfus' arrival, was destined to be his abode.

On the summit of a desolate rock, far from the few palm-trees on the shore, a small hut of four cubic yards (3 m³) was built for him. Night and day an inspector stood guard at the door with strict orders not to address a word to him. In the daytime, the prisoner was permitted to exercise until sunset in a small rectangular space of about  near his hut.

Madame Dreyfus had asked permission to follow her husband to his place of exile. The wording of the law seemed to give her right of doing so. However, the ministry refused, alleging that the rules to which the condemned man was subject were incompatible with her presence. Therefore, Dreyfus had no company except that of his jailers.

The governor of the islands showed some humanity, but the head warder Lebars, who had received instructions from the minister to enforce harsh measures, went beyond his orders. Dreyfus was poorly fed, especially at the beginning of his term of exile, obliged to do all sorts of dirty work, lived by day among vermin and filth, and by night in a state of perpetual hallucination. Dreyfus, as was to be expected, soon fell a prey to fever, until the doctor interfered and obtained an amelioration of the rules.

Dreyfus himself, clearly convinced that it was his duty to live, fought energetically to do so. To keep up his physical strength, he compelled himself to take regular exercise. To prevent his intellect from getting dulled, he had books sent to him which he read and reread. He wrote out résumés, learned English, and took up his mathematical studies again. To employ the long hours of leisure that still remained he kept a diary. He could correspond with only his own family and, even to them, might refer only to domestic matters. His letters, examined by the administration, were one long cry for justice. Sometimes he begged his wife to go, leading her children by the hand, to entreat for justice from the president of the republic. He wrote himself to the president, to Du Paty, and to General Raoul Le Mouton de Boisdeffre without receiving any replies.

Eventually the horrible climate did its work, as fever consumed him. He almost lost the power of speech from never employing it. Even his brain wasted away. On May 5, 1896, he wrote in his diary: "I have no longer anything to say; everything is alike in its horrible cruelty." His gentleness, his resignation, and his exact observance of all rules had not failed to make an impression on his jailers. Several of them believed him innocent. No punishment for rebellion against discipline was inflicted on him.

Early in September 1896, an English paper reported a false story of his escape. This rumor had been circulated by Mathieu Dreyfus in the hope of shaking up the sluggishness of public opinion and to prepare the way for the pamphlet of Bernard Lazare demanding a fresh hearing of the case of 1894. Although contradicted at once, the rumor roused public opinion. Rochefort and Drumont proclaimed the existence of a syndicate to free him, published some false information about the rules that the condemned man had to obey, and affirmed that with a little money it was the easiest thing imaginable to accomplish his rescue. At this, the colonial secretary, André Lebon, took fright. It did not matter that these tales were absolutely without foundation and that the prisoner was of irreproachable conduct. To make doubly sure, he cabled instructions to the governor of Guiana to surround the outer boundary of Dreyfus' exercising-ground with a solid fence, and to post a sentinel outside Dreyfus' hut in addition to the sentinel at the door.

Until this work was finished, the prisoner was to be secured day and night in his hut. At night, until further orders, he was to be subjected to the penalty of the "double buckle": gyves in which the prisoner's feet were shackled, and which were then firmly fixed to his bedstead, so that he was condemned either to absolute immobility or to dreadful torture. This order, barbarous and illegal, was strictly carried out, to the equal astonishment of Dreyfus and his warders, for twenty-four sultry nights. For two months, he was not allowed to stir out of his disgusting and suffocating hovel. When the cabin was opened, it was encircled by a wall that hid even the sky.

Now utterly depressed, Dreyfus stopped keeping his diary on 10 September 1896, writing that he could not foresee on what day his brain would burst. His family was no longer allowed to send him books. His wife's letters were forwarded to him as copies rather than in her original hand. On June 6, 1897, a sail was sighted during the night and alarm-guns were fired. Dreyfus, startled in his sleep, saw his keepers with loaded rifles ready to shoot him down if he made one suspicious movement.

In August, the authorities ascertained that the heat and moisture in his stifling hut were really unbearable, and had the man transferred to a new cabin, larger than the first, but quite as dismal. A signal-tower was erected nearby, armed with a Hotchkiss gun. Happily for Dreyfus, his moral fortitude, after a temporary eclipse, had recovered its strength. From January 1898, his wife's letters, although containing no particulars, roused his hopes by a tone of confidence, which could not be mistaken. Eventful incidents had taken place during those three awful years. In particular, his brother, Mathieu Dreyfus, had worked tirelessly to prove his innocence.

See also
 J'Accuse…!, influential 1898 open letter written by Émile Zola

Citations

References 
 

Dreyfus affair
1894 in France
1895 in France
1894 in law
1895 in law
19th-century trials